Le Bras is a Breton family name. It may refer to:

People with the surname
 Dan ar Braz, Breton guitar player
 David Le Bras,  (born 1983), Breton football player
 Gabriel Le Bras (1891–1970), Breton legal scholar and sociologist
 Hervé Le Bras (born 1943), French demographer and historian
 Jean-Pierre Le Bras (1931–2017), Breton landscape and maritime painter
 Roger Le Bras, French water polo player

Geography
 Le Bras (Ferrée River tributary), in Bas-Saint-Laurent and Chaudière-Appalaches, Quebec, Canada
 Le Gros Bras (Gouffre River tributary), in Saint-Urbain, Quebec, Canada
 Le Petit Bras (Le Gros Bras), a tributary of Le Gros Bras, in Saint-Urbain, Quebec, Canada